English script can refer to either:

 Latin script, the script used for writing the English language
 English alphabet, the set of letters in the script
 English script (calligraphy), a font style first used in the eighteenth century in England.
 Shavian alphabet, the phonetic script for writing the English language